This is a list of members of the Western Australian Legislative Council from December 1890 until July 1894.

Prior to the passage of the Constitution Act 1889, Western Australia had a partly elected and partly nominated Legislative Council. The Act created a fully elective Western Australian Legislative Assembly as a separate house, and a 15-seat Council whose members were nominated by the Governor of Western Australia. It was anticipated by Part III of the Constitution that the Council would remain purely nominative until the colony had reached a population of 60,000—seen as a distant goal with an 1888 population of 43,814 and the levelling off of earlier growth. However, due to the gold rush which saw thousands of people migrate from other Australian colonies and from overseas, the population reached 64,923 by 31 December 1893. The Constitution Act Amendment Act 1893 was passed to transform the Council into an elective house of 21 members on a restricted franchise, effective from the 1894 elections.

Sources
 

Members of Western Australian parliaments by term